Daniel Campos-Hull (born 3 August 1989 in Barcelona) is a Spanish race car driver. His father is Spanish and his mother English.

Career
Campos-Hull began his career in open wheel motor racing in 2006, racing mostly in the German Formula BMW and Italian Formula Renault championships coming 18th and 23rd respectively. The Spaniard also had two starts in the Formula Renault Eurocup at the second meeting of the season at the Istanbul Park in Turkey.

For 2007, Campos-Hull entered his second season of German Formula BMW. The young Spaniard impressed, taking four podiums in the first six races before winning both races at the fourth meeting at the Nürburgring. Campos-Hull finished second in that year's championship to Jens Klingmann.

The Spaniard moved up a class for 2008 after being hired by HBR Motorsport to drive one of their Formula Three cars in the Formula Three Euroseries alongside Lebanese driver Basil Shaaban. He failed to score a point in his rookie season.

In 2009 he moved to Italian Formula 3 and drove for Prema Powerteam (Dallara-FPT). He finished 5th overall with 148 points after an amazing season in which he challenged the leader Zampieri until the last week-end of race. At started the last event in Monza as second overall but an accident caused by his team-mate Castellacci at the first corner forced him to retire after a few hundred meters. He then started last in the following day's race but he's been able to recover up to third. This effort was anyway not enough to end the championship among top-3.

Motor racing results

Formula 3 Euro Series
(key)

References

External links
 
 

1989 births
Living people
Racing drivers from Barcelona
Formula BMW ADAC drivers
Italian Formula Renault 2.0 drivers
Formula Renault Eurocup drivers
Formula 3 Euro Series drivers
British Formula Three Championship drivers
Italian Formula Three Championship drivers
Spanish people of English descent
Prema Powerteam drivers
Eifelland Racing drivers
Italian Formula Renault 1.6 drivers
Josef Kaufmann Racing drivers